Thomas Hayward may refer to:
 Thomas Hayward (16th-century MP) (died 1534), MP for Ipswich in 1529
 Thomas Hayward (cricketer) (1835–1876), English cricketer
 Thomas Hayward (Royal Navy officer) (1767–1798), British sailor who was present during the mutiny on the Bounty 
 Thomas Hayward (tenor) (1917–1995), American operatic tenor
 Thomas B. Hayward (1924-2022), Chief of Naval Operations for the United States Navy
 Thomas B. Hayward (politician) (1838–1919), American politician
 Tom Hayward (1871–1939), English cricketer
 Thomas Hayward (Australian politician) (1832–1915), Australian politician
 Tom Hayward (motorcyclist) (born 1982), British Grand Prix motorcycle racer
 Thomas Hayward (literary editor) (died 1779?), editor of The British Muse (1738) and lawyer
 Thomas Hayward (MP for Ludgershall) (1706–1781), British MP for Ludgershall
 Thomas Hayward (Florida politician), one of the mayors of Tallahassee, Florida
 Thomas Hayward (warden), warden of New College, Oxford, from 1764 to 1768

See also
 Thomas Heyward Jr. (1746–1809), a signer of the United States Declaration of Independence
 Thomas Heywood (disambiguation)